Attention-Deficit/Hyperactivity Disorder (ADHD) is a neurodevelopmental disorder characterized by difficulty focusing attention, hyperactivity, and impulsive behavior. Treatments generally involve behavioral therapy and/or medications (stimulants and non-stimulants). ADHD is estimated to affect about 6 to 7 percent of people aged 18 and under when diagnosed via the DSM-IV criteria. When diagnosed via the ICD-10 criteria, hyperkinetic disorder (the ICD-10 term for severe ADHD) gives rates between 1 and 2 percent in this age group.

Children in North America appear to have a higher rate of ADHD than children in Africa and the Middle East - however, this may be due to differing methods of diagnosis used in different areas of the world. If the same diagnostic methods are used rates are more or less the same between countries.

Africa
In 2020, a meta-analysis of studies found that 7.47% of children and adolescents across Africa have ADHD. ADHD was found more often in boys, at a rate of 2:1. The most common form of ADHD was inattentive (2.95% of total population), followed by hyperactive/impulsive (2.77%), then combined (2.44%). While differences in prevalence rate were found internationally, it is not clear whether this reflects true differences or changes in methodology.

Asia 
The estimated prevalence of childhood ADHD in Asia is less than 5%, which is similar to its prevalence in South America, Europe, North America, and Oceania. The estimated prevalence of adult ADHD is 25.66% in the South-East Asia Region and 9.67% in the Western Pacific Region.

China 
Utilizing data from the WHO World Mental Health (WMH) Surveys, it is estimated that, in China (Shenzhen), the prevalence of childhood ADHD is 0.7% and the prevalence of adult ADHD is 1.8%. This study also determined that for adults in China (Shenzhen) with existing ADHD, 62.8% had a history of childhood ADHD. Another study utilizing systematic review estimated the prevalence of childhood ADHD in China, Hong Kong, and Taiwan to be 6.3%, with the individual regions exhibiting prevalences of 6.5%, 6.4%, and 4.2% respectively. Variability in the ADHD prevalences of children in China can be attributed to differences in study methodology, socioeconomics, and dates of data collection.

India 
The estimated prevalence of childhood ADHD in India is 7.1%, with individual study estimates ranging from 1.30% to 28.9%. Male children in India exhibited a slightly higher ADHD prevalence of 9.40% compared to 5.20% in female children. Overall, the prevalence of childhood ADHD in India does not differ significantly from the global prevalence, but there may be additional stigma associated with mental disorders in India.

Middle East 
The estimated prevalence of ADHD in Arab countries among schoolchildren (ages 6–12 years) ranges between 7.8-11.1%, while it was higher, at 16%, in studies that included younger children (ages 3 to 15 years). This variation was primarily explained by methodological differences between studies. However, all studies in various Arab countries revealed a male predominance of ADHD.

Saudi Arabia 
The prevalence of attention deficit hyperactivity disorder was found to be 3.4% overall in Riyadh, Saudi Arabia, among primary school students between the years of 2015 and 2016, with 22 children having symptoms that were both reported by their parents and teachers. The gender split among them was 3:1, with 13 (5.7%) boys and 9 (2.1%) girls.

Iran 
A systemic review of studies carried out in various Iranian cities between January 1990 and December 2018 revealed a prevalence of ADHD that ranged from 3.17% to 17.3%. Overall, boys (5.03% to 29%) had higher numbers compared to girls (2.3% to 15%).

Iraq 
The prevalence rate of ADHD was found to be 8.67% in a cross-sectional study done in Tikrit City, Iraq in 2012–2013 among students in 6 primary schools for boys and girls. Male to female ratio was 1.87:1, and boys made up the majority of those affected (65%). 49% of them were younger than 9 years old. In this study, the inattention subtype was most prevalent (38%) followed by combined (34%) and hyperactive (28%).

Lebanon 
Between March 2012 and December 2012, a cross-sectional survey of 510 Arabic-speaking adolescents aged 11 to 17 years and 11 months who resided in Beirut found that 52 (10.20%) of the sample had been diagnosed with ADHD, of which 77% had the combined type and 6% had the inattentive type. 35 (67.31%) of those diagnosed were male, and 49 (94.23%) were Lebanese citizens.

Qatar 
Results from a cross-sectional study in Qatar Independent and Private Schools revealed that boys between the ages of 6 and 9 exhibited the most ADHD symptoms, with 16.36% of them scoring higher than the 5% threshold for the disorder on the SNAP-IV, standardized rating scale, as opposed to only 4.13% of girls in the same age group. 12.32% of the boys between the ages of 10 and 12 who took the SNAP test showed ADHD symptoms above the 5% cutoff point, and 6.08% of the girls had symptoms severe enough to warrant a clinical assessment for ADHD. In Qatari schools, the average percentage of students aged 6 to 19 with ADHD symptoms was 8.3%.

Australia 
The Australian Institute of Health and Welfare reports that the most recent national data on childhood and adolescent mental health (gathered in 2013–14) demonstrated that the prevalence of ADHD was 8.2% in children aged 4–11 and 6.3% in adolescents aged 12–17. Severe disorders were more common among boys (10.9%) than girls (5.4%). In comparison to females aged 4–11 years, the prevalence of ADHD was lower in females aged 12–17 years (2.7% vs. 5.4%), although it was roughly the same in males (9.8% vs. 10.9%). An association with household income was also discovered for ADHD, with the odds of a child or adolescent being diagnosed with ADHD being 1.5 times higher in families in the lowest tercile of household income compared to those in the highest tercile. The prevalence of childhood ADHD in Oceania does not significantly differ from South America, North America, Europe, and Asia.

Europe

Germany
A 2008 evaluation of the “KiGGS” survey, monitoring 14,836 girls and boys (age between 3 and 17 years), showed that 4.8% of the participants had an ADHD diagnosis. While 7.9% of all boys had ADHD, only 1.8% girls had it, too. Another 4.9% of the participants (6.4% boys : 3.6% girls) were suspected ADHD cases, because they showed a rate ≥7 on the Strengths and Difficulties Questionnaire (SDQ) scale. The number of ADHD diagnoses was 1.5% (2.4% : 0.6%) among preschool children (3–6 years old), 5,3 % (8.7% : 1.9%) at age 7–10 years, and had its peak at 7.1% (11.3% : 3.0%) in the age group of 11–13 years. Among 14 to 17 years old adolescents the rate was 5.6% (9.4% : 1.8%).

Spain
Rates in Spain are estimated at 6.8% among people under 18.

United Kingdom
Estimates of the prevalence of childhood ADHD in the United Kingdom (UK) ranges from 0.2% to 2.2%, varying by the study methodology. The estimated adult ADHD prevalence in the UK is 0.1%. In some parts of England, there were waiting lists of five years or more for ADHD adult diagnostic assessment in 2019.

North America

In the United States it is diagnosed in 2-16 percent of school children. The rates of diagnosis and treatment of ADHD are much higher on the east coast of the United States than on its west coast. The frequency of the diagnosis differs between male children (10%) and female children (4%) in the United States. This difference between genders may reflect either a difference in susceptibility or that females with ADHD are less likely to be diagnosed than males. Boys outnumber girls across all three subtyping categories, but the exact magnitude of these differences seems to depend on both the informant (parent, teacher, etc.) and the subtype. In two community-based investigations, conducted by DuPaul and associates, boys outnumbered girls by only 2.2:1 in parent-generated samples and 2.3:1 in teacher-based input.

South America 
The estimated prevalence of symptomatic adult ADHD in the Region of the Americas (North America and South America) is 6.06%. The estimated prevalence of childhood ADHD in South America is 11.8%. This is not significantly different from North America, Europe, Oceania, or Asia. The estimated childhood ADHD prevalences for Colombia, Peru, and Brazil are 1.2%, 0.8%, and 2.5% respectively. The estimated adult ADHD prevalences for Colombia, Peru, and Brazil are 2.5%, 1.4%, and 5.9% respectively.

Changing rates
Rates of ADHD diagnosis and treatment have increased in both the United Kingdom and the United States since the 1970s. This is believed to be primarily due to changes in how the condition is diagnosed and how readily people are willing to treat it with medications rather than a true change in the frequency. In the UK an estimated 0.5 per 1,000 children had ADHD in the 1970s, while 3 per 1,000 received ADHD medications in the late 1990s. In the UK in 2003, 3.6 percent of male children and less than 1 percent in female children had the diagnosis. In the United States the number of children with the diagnosis increase from 12 per 1000 in the 1970s to 34 per 1000 in the late 1990s, to 95 per 1,000 in 2007, and 110 per 1,000 in 2011. It is believed that the changes to the diagnostic criteria in 2013 from the DSM 4TR to the DSM 5 will increase the number of people with ADHD especially among adults.

References

External links 
 

Attention deficit hyperactivity disorder
Attention Deficit

fr:Trouble du déficit de l'attention avec ou sans hyperactivité#Épidémiologie